Vasudeo S. Gaitonde (1924 – 10 August 2001), also known as V. S. Gaitonde, was regarded as one of India's foremost abstract painters. He received the Padma Shri by the Government of India in 1971.

Early life and education
Gaitonde was born in 1924, in Nagpur, Maharashtra, to Goan parents. He completed his art diploma at Sir J. J. School of Art in 1948, and in 1950 was invited to join the influential Bombay Progressive Artists' Group.

Career
Impressed by his work, Vasudev was invited to join the Progressive Artists Group of Bombay formed in 1947 by artists like Francis Newton Souza and S. H. Raza and Maqbool Fida Husain. He actively participated in the activities of the group. He had several exhibitions held in India as well as in foreign countries.

In 1956, he participated in the Indian art exhibition, which was held in Eastern European countries. He also participated in other group exhibitions held at the Graham Art Gallery, New York, in 1959 and 1963. Gaitonde's abstract works are produced in many Indian and overseas collections including the Museum of Modern Art, New York.

In 1957, he was awarded the first prize at the Young Asian Artists Exhibition, Tokyo and the Rockefeller Fellowship followed in 1964. In 1971, he was awarded the Padma Shri by the Government of India.
 
He lived and worked in Nizamuddin East area of Delhi, and died in 2001, in obscurity.

Style
″A quiet man and a painter of the quiet reaches of the imagination" as one of his admirers once called him, defines Gaitonde best, who has the appearance of an intellectual, literally simmering with some unexplored thought. Conceptually, he never considered himself an abstract painter and is averse to be called one. In fact he asserts that there is no such thing as abstract painting, instead he refers to his work as "non-objective" a kind of personalised hieroglyphics and calligraphic inventions, evoking the surface painted on with the most astounding intuitions, which he has realised in his inevitable meeting, in discovering Zen. The meditative Zen quality that transpires his speech, emoting silence is exemplified in his work best, as silence is eternal and meaningful in itself, from this point one does tend to identify the mysterious motifs, the highly personalised hieroglyphs in Gaitonde's canvasses with the manifestation of intuitions, invested in their His work is influenced by Zen philosophy and ancient calligraphy.

Legacy
After the media reports of the auction interest in his work has grown, even at his birthplace Nagpur, where his painting till then lying at warehouse of Central Museum, Nagpur was sent for restoration. It was put on public display in January 2014.

In October 2014, the first retrospective of his work took place at the Solomon R. Guggenheim Museum in New York, titled V. S. Gaitonde: Painting as Process, Painting as Life.

Exhibitions
1949 Progressive Art Group Exhibition, Bombay Art Society Salon, Bombay.
1956 Indian Art Exhibition, Eastern Europe.
1957 5,00 Years of Indian Art, Essex.
1957 Young Asian Artists, Tokyo.
1958, 59, 63 Group shows in London and New York.
1965 Solo exhibition in New York.
1966, 67, 70, 73, 74, 77, 80 Solo exhibition in Bombay.
1982 Contemporary Indian Art at the Festival of India, London.
2014 V. S. Gaitonde: Painting as Process, Painting as Life, Solomon R. Guggenheim Museum in New York.

Collections
National Gallery of Modern Art, New Delhi.
Lalit Kala Akademi, New Delhi.
Tata Institute of Fundamental Research, Mumbai.
Museum of Modern Art, New York.
Pundole Art Gallery, Mumbai.
Progressive Art Gallery, New Delhi.
Mr. Bal Chhabda, Mumbai.
Jehangir Nicholson Collection, Mumbai, (Prince of Wales Museum)

Awards
1950 Silver Medal, Bombay Art Society, Bombay.
1957 Young Asian Artists Award, Tokyo.
1971 Padma Shri by Government of India
1964–65  Rockefeller Fellowship, USA
 1989–90 Kalidas Samman, Government of Madhya Pradesh

List of major works
 Homi Bhabha Study – 1959

See also
 F. N. Souza 
 Vamona Navelcar

References

External links
"V S Gaitonde Profile, Interview and Artworks"
 Vasudeo S. Gaitonde, National Gallery of Modern Art
Profile 
 
 Gaitonde abstract fetches Rs 92 lakh, Deccan Herald, Feb 11, 2005

Indian male painters
Indian contemporary painters
Sir Jamsetjee Jeejebhoy School of Art alumni
1924 births
2001 deaths
Rockefeller Fellows
Recipients of the Padma Shri in arts
Goan people
Abstract painters
Artists from Nagpur
20th-century Indian painters
Painters from Maharashtra